Ururi (Arbërisht: Rùri) is an Arbëreshë comune in the Province of Campobasso, in the Italian region Molise, located about  northeast of Campobasso. Ururi developed in the late 16th century settlement when Albanian military captain Teodoro Crescia gained a feud for the annual sum of 300 ducats in a depopulated area near Larino. Until 1583, it was repopulated with many Albanian families.

Ururi borders the following municipalities: Larino, Montorio nei Frentani, Rotello, San Martino in Pensilis.

Transportation 
Ururi is served by a railway station, the Ururi-Rotello railway station, on the Termoli-Campobasso and Termoli–Venafro line.

The station, however, has been closed for a few years and does not have passenger service.

References

Bibliography 

Arbëresh settlements
Cities and towns in Molise